Feydhoo (Dhivehi: ފޭދޫ) is one of the inhabited islands of the Shaviyani Atoll administrative division that is geographically part of the Miladhummadulhu Atoll in the Maldives. Feydhoo is located in the centre of the atoll between the channel called Noomara Kandu and the island Bileffahi.

History
Feydhoo was severely damaged during the cyclone of 1821 that hit the northern atolls of the Maldives. This was during the reign of Sultan Muhammad Mueenuddeen I.

Geography

Demography

References

Islands of the Maldives